Jorden Merrilees (born 24 July 1994) is an Australian swimmer. He competed in the men's 200 metre backstroke event at the 2018 FINA World Swimming Championships (25 m), in Hangzhou, China.

References

External links
 

1994 births
Living people
Australian male backstroke swimmers
Place of birth missing (living people)
21st-century Australian people